USS AFDM-2, (former YFD-4), is an  medium auxiliary floating drydock built in Mobile, Alabama by the Alabama Drydock and Shipbuilding Company for the U.S. Navy. Originally named USS YFD-4, Yard Floating Dock-4, she operated by Todd Shipyards at New Orleans, Louisiana for the repair of US ships during World War II. YFD-4 was renamed an Auxiliary Floating Dock Medium AFDM-2 in 1945 after the war.

Design 
AFDM-2 could lift capacity 9,000 tons and had two service cranes to lift material and parts for removing damage parts and the installation of new parts. Ballast pontoons tanks are flooded with water to submerge or pumped dry to raise the ship.

History
It was built by Alabama Drydock and Shipbuilding Company in Mobile, Alabama. she was laid down in January 1942 and commissioned on 1 October 1943, right after her delivery to the Navy.

Hurricane Betsy, Category 4, sank and damaged AFDM-2 on 9 September 1965. USS AFDM-2 was at Todd Shipyards on the west side of the Mississippi River in Algiers, New Orleans. AFDM-2 had the water pumped out of her pontoon tanks and was raised for repair. Due to the large size of AFDM-2 two rescue and salvage ships,  and  arrived with three special support barges to help in the salvage. Land-based winches were also used in the recovery. On 25 August 1966 tugs returned AFDM-2 to Todd Shipyards, eleven months after her sinking. Repairs where completed and she was put back in service. Divers had to repair more than 100 holes in AFDM-2 to float her again.

On 16 May 1995 she was laid up in the National Defense Reserve Fleet, Beaumont, Texas. On 11 February 1999 she was reactivated and transferred to the Government of the Dominican Republic. She was later sold to Gulf Copper & Manufacturing Corporation at Port Arthur, Texas and renamed Mr. Morris. In 2013 , a landing ship, tank, now a  museum ship, was repaired in AFDM-2. On 17 December 2021, USS Orleck (DD-886) arrived in Port Arthur to be repaired in AFDM-2.

Awards 

 American Campaign Medal 
 Asiatic-Pacific Campaign Medal 
 World War II Victory Medal

See also
 Dry dock
 Hughes Mining Barge
 Semi-submersible naval vessel
 List of auxiliaries of the United States Navy

References

External links
 photo USS LST-325 a Landing Ship, Tank in AFDM-2 – Mr. Morris
 photo USS LST-325 high and dry in AFDM-2 – Mr. Morris
 photo USS LST-325 high and dry in AFDM-2 – Mr. Morris

World War II auxiliary ships of the United States
Floating drydocks of the United States Navy
1943 ships